The 2013–14 Women's National League was the third season of the Women's National League. This was the final season the league was sponsored by Bus Éireann. In June 2013 the Football Association of Ireland announced Galway W.F.C. as an expansion team for the upcoming season. Raheny United won their second WNL title  and also win the 2013 FAI Women's Cup. Meanwhile, Wexford Youths won their first trophy, the 2014 WNL Cup, with a 3–0 over Castlebar Celtic. Julie-Ann Russell of Peamount United was named 2013–14 Player of the Season.

The WNL received international publicity in October 2013 when Stephanie Roche scored an acclaimed goal for Peamount United against Wexford Youths which became popular on YouTube. Footage of the goal was uploaded to the internet by team manager Eileen Gleeson as the matches were not televised.  Later that year Roche, James Rodríguez and Robin van Persie were finalists for the 2014 FIFA Puskás Award, for the best goal of the year. At the 2014 FIFA Ballon d'Or awards ceremony on 12 January 2015, Roche finished in second place to Rodríguez with 33% of the vote.

Final table

WNL Awards
Senior Player of the Year
 Julie-Ann Russell (Peamount United)
Young Player of the Year
 Katie McCabe (Raheny United)
Top Goalscorer Award
 Stephanie Roche (Peamount United)
Hall of Fame Award 
 Sylvia Gee (DLR Waves)
Team of the Season

References

Women's National League (Ireland) seasons
Ireland
Women
Women
1